Mohammad Ali Khosravi (born 3 November 2001) is an Iranian taekwondoka. He began taekwondo in 2010 under the supervision of Mehdi Mohammadzadeh, then in 2013 he became a member of the Iran national taekwondo team. Mohammad Ali Khosravi achieved the gold medal of the 2018 Summer Youth Olympics Games in Buenos Aires.

He also won a gold medal at the 2018 Youth World Championships.

Medallists

Braket

See also

 Youth Olympic Games
 Taekwondo at the 2018 Summer Youth Olympics
 World Taekwondo Junior Championships

References

External links

 Olympic Website
 WTF Ranking
 Iran Taekwondo Federation
 World Taekwondo Federation
 Olympic Website
 Mohammadali Khosravi On Instagram

2001 births
Living people
Iranian male taekwondo practitioners
Taekwondo practitioners at the 2018 Summer Youth Olympics
Sportspeople from Tehran
Youth Olympic gold medalists for Iran
21st-century Iranian people